African payal is a common name for several aquatic plants which are invasive in India:

Salvinia auriculata, native to the Americas
Salvinia molesta